Rugby and Kenilworth was a county constituency in Warwickshire, England. It returned one Member of Parliament to the House of Commons of the Parliament of the United Kingdom. It existed from 1983 to 2010.

History
The constituency of Rugby and Kenilworth was created for the 1983 election and was held by the Conservative Jim Pawsey until the 1997 election when the Labour candidate Andy King was narrowly elected. In the 2001 election he increased his majority slightly. The Conservatives regained the seat in 2005, with Jeremy Wright becoming the Member of Parliament.

Rugby and Kenilworth was a marginal seat from 1997 onwards, but had been a safe Conservative seat previously (see Elections). Rugby, being an industrial town, traditionally leans towards Labour. Kenilworth, however, is a prosperous dormitory town and leans towards the Conservatives.

Boundaries
1983–2010: The Borough of Rugby wards of Admirals, Benn, Bilton, Brownsover, Caldecott, Clifton and Newton, Dunchurch and Thurlaston, Eastlands, Hillmorton, Knightlow, Lawford, Leam Valley, New Bilton, Newbold, Overslade, Paddox, Ryton-on-Dunsmore, St Mary's, and Wolston, and the District of Warwick wards of Abbey, Park Hill, St John's, and Stoneleigh.

This Warwickshire seat took in areas from the Rugby and Warwick local authorities. From Rugby came the town itself, and parishes on the Leicestershire and Northamptonshire borders. From neighbouring Warwick came Kenilworth and country villages bordering Coventry and Solihull.

Boundary review
Following the Boundary Commission for England's review of parliamentary representation in Warwickshire, the Rugby and Kenilworth constituency was abolished for the 2010 general election.

The successor seats were Kenilworth and Southam, which was originally to be named "Mid Warwickshire", and a re-created Rugby constituency.

Members of Parliament

Elections

Elections in the 2000s

Elections in the 1990s

Elections in the 1980s

See also
List of parliamentary constituencies in Warwickshire

Notes and references

Kenilworth
Borough of Rugby
Parliamentary constituencies in Warwickshire (historic)
Constituencies of the Parliament of the United Kingdom established in 1983
Constituencies of the Parliament of the United Kingdom disestablished in 2010